16th Bombardment Squadron may refer to:

 The 522d Special Operations Squadron, designated the 16th Bombardment Squadron (Light) from January 1940 until August 1943
 The 916th Air Refueling Squadron, designated the 16th Bombardment Squadron, Very Heavy from April 1944 until April 1946